Bernhard Lösener (December 27, 1890 – August 28, 1952) was a lawyer and Jewish expert in the Reich Ministry of the Interior. Along with Wilhelm Stuckart, he helped draft the Nuremberg Laws, among other legislation that deprived German Jews of their rights and ultimately led to their deportation to concentration camps.

In his memoirs, Legislating the Holocaust, Lösener described his discovery of the Rumbula massacre, in which approximately 1,000 recently deported German Jews were transported by train to Rumbula Forest in Riga, Latvia and there summarily executed along with 25,000 Latvian Jews. Lösener wrote he had not been aware of any orders to execute the German Jews and was disturbed by the executions. He discussed the incident with Stuckart which caused tension between them. Three years later in 1944, according to Lösener's Reich Ministry records, he was arrested for expressing sympathy for the German Jews.

Lösener supported the exemption of the mischling, which is  the term used in Nazi Germany to represent individuals classified with both Aryan and Jewish ancestry. Lösener surmised that having one or two Jewish grandparents was clear classification of being Jewish. He successfully argued that classifying such persons as Jewish would strengthen the Jewish gene pool by infusing Aryan blood. In addition, the exemption would enhance the Army by 45,000 soldiers. Since most mischling were not deported during the war, the classification may have saved up to 107,000 Germans of some Jewish ancestry from the Holocaust.

At the Nuremberg Trials, Lösener gave testimony on his  discussion with Stuckart regarding the Rumbula massacre in 1941. This testimony countered Stuckart's claim he had been unaware of the execution of Jews prior to the Wannsee Conference in 1942.

References

External links 
Minutes of Wannsee Conference
Steven Spielberg/United States Holocaust Museum
International Military Tribunal, Nuremberg trials transcripts and documentary evidence of German medical experiments in the commission of war crimes and crimes against humanity 1946-1947

1890 births
1952 deaths
Lawyers in the Nazi Party
International Military Tribunal in Nuremberg
Holocaust perpetrators in Germany